Underactuation is a technical term used in robotics and control theory to describe mechanical systems that cannot be commanded to follow arbitrary trajectories in configuration space.  This condition can occur for a number of reasons, the simplest of which is when the system has a lower number of actuators than degrees of freedom.  In this case, the system is said to be trivially underactuated.

The class of underactuated mechanical systems is very rich and includes such diverse members as automobiles, airplanes, and even animals.

Definition
To understand the mathematical conditions which lead to underactuation, one must examine the dynamics that govern the systems in question.  Newton's laws of motion dictate that the dynamics of mechanical systems are inherently second order.  In general, these dynamics can be described by a second order differential equation:

Where:

 is the position state vector   is the vector of control inputs   is time.

Furthermore, in many cases the dynamics for these systems can be rewritten to be affine in the control inputs:

When expressed in this form, the system is said to be underactuated if:

When this condition is met, there are acceleration directions that can not be produced no matter what the control vector is.

Note that  does not explicitly represent the number of actuators present in the system. Indeed, there may be more actuators than degrees of freedom and the system may still be underactuated. That is, there may exist states in which an otherwise fully actuated system becomes underactuated.

Examples

The classic inverted pendulum is an example of a trivially underactuated system: it has two degrees of freedom (one for its support's motion in the horizontal plane, and one for the angular motion of the pendulum), but only one of them (the cart position) is actuated, and the other is only indirectly controlled.  Although naturally extremely unstable, this underactuated system is still controllable.

A standard automobile is underactuated due to the nonholonomic constraints imposed by the wheels.  That is, a car cannot accelerate in a direction perpendicular to the direction the wheels are facing. A similar argument can be made for boats, planes and most other vehicles.

See also
 Passive dynamics

References

Further reading
 M. Saliba, and C.W. de Silva, "An Innovative Robotic Gripper for Grasping and Handling Research," IEEE Journal of Robotics and Automation, pp. 975–979, 1991.
 N. Dechev, W.L. Cleghorn, and S. Naumann,  “Multiple Finger, Passive Adaptive Grasp Prosthetic Hand,” Journal of Mechanism and Machine Theory, Vol. 36, No. 10, pp. 1157–1173, 2001.

External links
  Canudas-de-Wit, C. On the concept of virtual constraints as a tool for walking robot control and balancing  Annual Reviews in Control, 28 (2004), pp. 157–166. (Elsevier)
Nonlinear Systems College of Mechanical and Nuclear Engineering, Kansas State University

Robot control
Control theory